Tomás Enrique Soley Soler  (1939–2001) was a Costa Rican politician.  He began as a diplomat for Costa Rica in 1965.  He died as an ambassador to Costa Rica in Honduras in 2001.

Costa Rican politicians
1939 births
2001 deaths